Prince Johann of Hohenzollern-Sigmaringen (17 August 1578 in Sigmaringen – 22 March 1638 in Munich), was the ruling Count of Hohenzollern-Sigmaringen from 1606 to 1623.  He was elevated to the rank of prince in 1623 and so was Prince of Hohenzollern-Sigmaringen from 1623 until his death.

Life 
Johann was the eldest surviving son of Count Karl II of Hohenzollern-Sigmaringen (1547–1606), from his marriage to Euphrosyne (1552–1590), the daughter of Count Friedrich  V of Oettingen-Wallerstein.  He studied law and political sciences at the Universities of Freiburg and Ingolstadt.

On 30 June 1602 in Sigmaringen, Johann married the three years younger Countess Johanna (1581–1634), the daughter of Count Eitel Friedrich IV of Hohenzollern-Hechingen.

On 8 April 1606, his father died and Johann inherited the county.

Unlike their relatives who ruled the Electorate of Brandenburg, the Sigmaringen branch of the House of Hohenzollern had remained Catholic.  However, Sigmaringen was located in the immediate vicinity of the Evangelical Duchy of Württemberg, and thus on a prominent position in the escalating confessional conflict.  Johann aligned himself closely to the Duchy of Bavaria, the pioneer of the Catholic League.  Johann's son and successor, Meinrad I, was even born in Munich in 1605.

The alliance with Duke Maximilian I of Bavarian, who had been a close friend of the later Emperor Ferdinand since his teens, paid divident in 1623, after Bohemia had been subdued by Bavaria and Bavaria had been elevated to an electorate, Johann and his cousin Johann Georg of Hohenzollern-Hechingen were elevated to Princes.

In 1634, the Hohenzollern-Haigerloch line died out and its territory fell to Johann.  His financial situation allowed Johann to make substantial donations to the churches and monasteries in his territory and to further expand his Sigmaringen Castle.

Sigmaringen was affected by the devastation of the Thirty Years' War.  In 1632, Sigmaringen Castle was conquered by Sweden.  In 1633, it was liberated by imperial troops.  However, during the fighting it burned down.  Johann fled to Braunau am Inn, together with Duke Maximilian, whom he served as secret councillor.  After Johann resigned from Maximilian's service, he received the Lordship of Schwabegg from the Duke.  Johann remained in Bavaria and died at the age of 60, in Munich in 1638, four years after his wife had died.  Earlier that year, he had been elevated to the rank of Imperial Prince, in other words, he had received a seat in the college of princes in the Imperial Diet.

Issue 
From his marriage to Johanna, Johann had the following children:

 Meinrad I (1605–1681), Prince of Hohenzollern-Sigmaringen
 married in 1635 to Countess Anna Maria Toerring-Seefeld (1613–1682)
 Marie (1606–1674), married:
 in 1625 to Count Paul Andreas of Wolkenstein (1595–1635)
 to Baron Rudolph Georg of Haßlang (died after 1676)
 Euphrosyne Sibylle (1607–1636)
 married in  1628 to Count Ernst Benno of Wartenberg (1604–1666)

Ancestry

References 
 Gustav Schilling: Geschichte des Hauses Hohenzollern in genealogisch fortlaufenden Biographien aller seiner Regenten von den ältesten bis auf die neuesten Zeiten, nach Urkunden und andern authentischen Quellen, Fleischer, Leipzig, 1843, p. 266 ff, Online
 E. G. Johler: Geschichte, Land- und Ortskunde der souverainen teutschen Fürstenthümer Hohenzollern Hechingen und Sigmaringen, Stettin'sche Buchhandlung, Ulm, 1824, p. 65 ff, Online

External links 
 Family tree on the site of Hohenzollern.com

Princes of Hohenzollern-Sigmaringen
Counts of Hohenzollern-Haigerloch
House of Hohenzollern
1578 births
1638 deaths